The Metro League is a high school athletics conference in Seattle, Washington, part of the Washington Interscholastic Activities Association (WIAA).  Its 18 members are in SeaKing District II, which includes Seattle and east King County.

History

High school athletics in Seattle dates back to the end of the 19th century. The Seattle Times published a news article in 1897 documenting the formation of a football team for Seattle High School, later renamed Broadway High School

The Metro League was founded as the conference for Seattle public schools in 1912 and called the City League until 1959.

The Metro League football champion was awarded the Leon Brigham Trophy, originally donated by Royal Brougham.

Members

 Lincoln High School closed in 1981 due to declining enrollment but reopened in the fall of 2019.

 All girls school
 All boys school

Former Members

Sports

Boys Team State Championships

Baseball

Basketball

Cross Country

Football

Golf

Gymnastics (Defunct Sport)

Soccer

Swimming

Tennis

Track & Field

Girls Team State Championships

Basketball

Cross Country

Golf

Gymnastics

Soccer

Softball

Swimming & Diving

Tennis

Track & Field

Volleyball

Notable Metro League Athletes

Baseball

Ed Bahr (West Seattle), former MLB pitcher with the Pittsburgh Pirates in the 1940s.
Matt Boyd (Eastside Catholic), current MLB pitcher with the Detroit Tigers.
Mike Budnick (Queen Anne), pitcher who played two seasons with the New York Giants.
Paul Dade (Nathan Hale), former outfielder who played six seasons in MLB with three different teams.
Rich Hand (Lincoln), former pitcher who spent four seasons in MLB.
Jeff Heath (Garfield), played 14-seasons in MLB and was a three time ALL-Star.
John Hoffman (Franklin), played two seasons in MLB with the Houston Colt .45s/Astros.
Fred Hutchinson (Franklin), an All-Star pitcher who played 10 seasons in MLB. Went on to be the manager of three different MLB teams.
Chuck Jackson (Ingraham), Former MLB third basemen.
Chet Johnson (Ballard), pitcher who played one season with the St. Louis Browns.
Earl Johnson (Ballard), pitcher played for the Boston Red Sox for seven seasons.
Rondin Johnson (Chief Sealth), former MLB third basemen.
Keone Kela (Chief Sealth), current MLB pitcher for the Texas Rangers.
Mike Kinnunen (Lincoln), former MLB pitcher who holds the record for most pitching appearances without a decision of any kind.
Jake Lamb (Blanchet), current All-Star MLB third basemen for the Arizona Diamondbacks.
Tom Lampkin (Blanchet), played 13-seasons in MLB as a catcher.
Bill Lasley (Lincoln), former MLB pitcher who played one season for the St. Louis Browns.
Billy North (Garfield), career spanned 11-season in MLB. A World Series Champion and two time AL stolen base leader.
Ken Phelps (Ingraham), former MLB player and World Series champion who played for 11 seasons.
Bob Reynolds (Ingraham), former MLB pitcher in the 1960s and 1970s.
Pete Standridge (Lincoln), former pitcher who played for the Chicago Cubs and St. Louis Cardinals. 
Ron Santo (Franklin), third baseman who played 15 seasons in MLB and was a nine time All-Star and five time Gold Glove Award recipient.
Joe Staton (Garfield), played two seasons in MLB with the Detroit Tigers.
Mark Small (West Seattle), former MLB pitcher.
Sammy White (Lincoln), former MLB catcher and a 1953 All-Star.
Eric Wilkins (Garfield), former pitcher for the Cleveland Indians.
Dick Young (Lincoln), former second baseman who played two seasons for the Philadelphia Phillies.

Basketball

Paolo Banchero (O'Dea), first overall pick in the 2022 NBA Draft by the Orlando Magic.
MarJon Beauchamp (Nathan Hale, Garfield, Rainier Beach), 2022 NBA Draft first round draft pick by the Milwaukee Bucks.
Bruno Boin (Franklin), named to the University of Washington all century team and drafted in the 1958 and 1959 NBA Drafts.
Aaron Brooks (Franklin), NBA player and first round draft pick.
Kevin Burleson (O'Dea), former NBA player for the Charlotte Bobcats.
Doug Christie (Rainier Beach), played in the NBA for 15-seasons.
Will Conroy (Garfield), former NBA player.
Jamal Crawford (Rainier Beach), NBA basketball player and 2010, 2014, & 2016 6th Man of the Year.
Gillian d'Hondt (Blanchet), former women's professional basketball player.
Tara Davis (Rainier Beach), was drafted and played for the Seattle Reign of the ABL.
Tari Eason (Garfield), 2022 NBA Draft first round pick for the Houston Rockets.
James Edwards (Roosevelt), played 20-seasons in the NBA and three time NBA Champion.
Carl Ervin (Cleveland), drafted by the Seattle Supersonics in 1980 and played two seasons in the Continental Basketball Association.
C. J. Giles (Rainier Beach), professional basketball player.
Chuck Gilmur (Lincoln), played five seasons in the NBA for the Chicago Stags and Washington Capitols.
Steven Gray (Bainbridge), current professional basketball player in Europe.
Al Hairston (Garfield), played three seasons in the NBA for the Seattle SuperSonics.
Spencer Hawes (Seattle Prep), NBA player and former first round draft pick.
Bob Houbregs (Queen Anne), 1953 NCAA Player of the Year and member of the Naismith Hall of Fame.
George Irvine (Ballard), former ABA and NBA player and NBA head coach.
Trent Johnson (Franklin), coached several college basketball programs and became the first African American man to be a head coach at LSU.
Sheila Lambert (Chief Sealth), former first round WNBA draft pick and WNBA Championship winner.
Naomi Mulitauaopele (Chief Sealth), played professionally in the WNBA and Europe.
Dejounte Murray (Rainier Beach), NBA player and former first round draft pick.
Jaylen Nowell (Garfield), 2019 second round NBA draft pick by the Minnesota Timberwolves.
Jawann Oldham (Cleveland), NBA player whose career spanned ten seasons.
Michael Porter Jr. (Nathan Hale), first round NBA draft pick by the Denver Nuggets.
Jontay Porter (Nathan Hale), signed as an undrafted free agent by the Memphis Grizzlies in 2020, younger brother of Michael Porter Jr.
Kevin Porter Jr. (Rainier Beach), 2019 first round NBA draft pick for the Cleveland Cavaliers .
Clint Richardson (O'Dea), 1983 NBA Champion who played 11 seasons as a guard.
Nate Robinson (Rainier Beach), NBA player and 2006, 2009, and 2010 NBA Slam Dunk Champion.
Brandon Roy (Garfield), former NBA Rookie of the Year and three time All-Star.
Tre Simmons (Garfield), current professional basketball player in Europe.
Peyton Siva (Franklin), former NBA player.
Doug Smart (Garfield), a standout for University of Washington who was drafted by the Detroit Pistons in 1959.
Rhonda Smith (Franklin), played in the ABL and was drafted into the WNBA.
Alvin Snow (Franklin), professional basketball player.
Jason Terry (Franklin), NBA player and 2009 Sixth Man of the Year.
Joyce Walker (Garfield), the third woman to join the Harlem Globetrotters.
Martell Webster (Seattle Prep), former NBA player and first round draft pick.
Damon Williams (Ballard), played professionally in Europe for almost 20-years.
Marcus Williams (Roosevelt), former NBA player.
Terrence Williams (Rainier Beach), former NBA player.
Lindsey Wilson (Roosevelt), third round WNBA draft pick and played professionally in Europe.
Tom Workman (Blanchet), former NBA player and first round draft pick.
Tony Wroten (Garfield), NBA player and first found draft pick.

Football

Anthony Allen (Garfield), played wide receiver in the NFL for five seasons.
Byron "By" Bailey (West Seattle), former NFL and CFL player; Canadian Football Hall of Fame member.
Mario Bailey (Franklin), University of Washington standout wide receiver who played professionally in the NFL and Europe.
Kay Bell (Lincoln), former linemen in the NFL and professional wrestler.
Bob Bellinger (Seattle Prep), former NFL guard.
Pat Brady (O'Dea), played three seasons in the NFL as a punter and was named to the Pittsburgh Steelers 50th Anniversary team.
Nate Burleson (O'Dea), played 11 seasons in the NFL as a wide receiver.
Leo Calland (Broadway), former college football and basketball coach.
Chuck Carroll (Garfield), a standout player at the University of Washington and member of the College Football Hall of Fame.
Jesse Chatman (Franklin), played six seasons in the NFL as a running back.
John Cherberg (Queen Anne), spent three seasons as head coach of the University of Washington football team.
Deandre Coleman (Garfield), played defensive tackle in the NFL from 2014 to 2017.
Bo Cornell (Roosevelt), former NFL linebacker and running back.
Don Coryell (Lincoln), former NFL head coach and member of the Los Angeles Chargers Hall of Fame.
Corey Dillon (Nathan Hale/Franklin), a four time Pro-Bowl running back played 10 season in the NFL and had over 11,000 rushing yards.
Demetrius DuBose (O'Dea), an All-American linebacker at Notre Dame and played five seasons in the NFL. 
Bryce Fisher (Seattle Prep), former NFL defensive lineman and Super Bowl Champion.
Lee Folkins (Roosevelt), Super Bowl Champion and Pro Bowl tight end in the NFL.
Myles Gaskin (O'Dea), All-time leader in rushing yards at the University of Washington, 7th round draft pick by the Miami Dolphins in 2019.
Reggie Grant (Chief Sealth), played one season as a defensive back for the New York Jets.
Fritz Greenlee (Franklin), former linebacker who played in both the NFL and CFL in the 1960s.
Tom Greenlee (Franklin), named to the University of Washington hall of fame and was drafted by the Chicago Bears in 1967.
Aaron Grymes (West Seattle), former NFL and current CFL player.
Halvor Hagen (Ballard), former NFL offensive lineman.
Homer Harris (Garfield), pioneering athlete who was the first African American player to captain a Big Ten team.
James Hasty (Franklin), played cornerback for 13 seasons in the NFL. Named to the Pro Bowl twice and All-Pro once.
Bruce Jarvis, (Franklin), played four years in the NFL as a center.
Greg Lewis (Ingraham), former NFL running back and first team All-American at University of Washington.
Joe Lombardi (Seattle Prep), current NFL coach.
Taylor Mays (O'Dea), played six seasons in the NFL as a safety. Currently plays in the CFL.
Terry Metcalf (Franklin), played six seasons as a running back in the NFL and three seasons in the CFL. Three time Pro-Bowler in the NFL.
Hugh Millen (Roosevelt), former NFL quarterback who had a ten-year NFL career.
Charley Mitchell (Garfield), played five seasons as a running back in the NFL.
Randy Montgomery (Cleveland), played five seasons in the NFL as a cornerback and kick returner.
Mark Pattison (Roosevelt), spent four years in the NFL as a wide receiver.
Ryan Phillips (Franklin), had a 12-year career in the Canadian Football League and was a five time CFL All-Star.
Aaron Pierce (Franklin), tight end who played seven season in the NFL.
Ray Pinney (Shorecrest), played seven years in the NFL and was a starting offensive tackle in Super Bowl XIII for the Pittsburgh Steelers.
Trent Pollard (Rainier Beach), former NFL guard with the Cincinnati Bengals.
Rick Redman (Blanchet), former AFL and NFL player and two time first team All-American at University of Washington.
Rick Sharp (Queen Anne), former NFL tackle who played with the Pittsburgh Steelers and Denver Broncos.
Sig Sigurdson (Ballard), played one season with the Baltimore Colts of the All-America Football Conference.
Ed Simmons (Nathan Hale), former NFL tackle and two time Super Bowl Champion.
Isaiah Stanback (Garfield), former NFL wide receiver and member of Super Bowl XLVI championship team.
Joe Steele (Blanchet), record-setting Washington Huskies running back.
Alameda Ta'amu (Rainier Beach), a nose tackle who played three seasons in the NFL.
Brice Taylor (Franklin), first African-American football player at University of Southern California.
Tom Turnure (Roosevelt), former NFL offensive lineman who played six seasons.
Marc Wilson (Shorecrest) Standout quarterback at BYU who finished third in the Heisman voting in 1979. He went on to have a 10-year career in the NFL.
Tony Zackery (Franklin), played three seasons in the NFL as a cornerback.

Golf

Don Bies (Ballard), former PGA Tour player.
Fred Couples (O'Dea), has 15 PGA Tour victories, including The Players Championship in 1984 and 1996 and the Masters Tournament in 1992.
Rick Fehr (Nathan Hale), former PGA Tour player.
Harry Givan (Lincoln), golfer who was selected for the U.S. team in the 1936 Walker Cup. 
Ruth Jessen (Roosevelt), former golfer with 11 LPGA Tour wins.
Karsten Solheim (Ballard), founder of PING golf club company.
Bill Wright (Franklin), first African American to win a USGA title.
Kermit Zarley (West Seattle), former professional golfer with three PGA tour wins.

Martial Arts
Sandra Bacher (Franklin), competed in three straight Olympics in the judo competition.
Josh Barnett (Ballard), former UFC heavyweight champion and current mixed martial artist.
Kenny Ellis (Rainier Beach), former middleweight boxer who held titles in the IBC, NABA, and NABO.
David Jackson (Garfield), Olympic lightweight boxer who competed at the 2000 Summer Olympics.
Maurice Smith (West Seattle), World Champion kickboxer and former MMA fighter.
Queen Underwood (Garfield), competed in women's boxing at the 2012 Summer Olympics.

Rowing
Chuck Alm (Roosevelt), rowed the men's coxed four at the 1960 Summer Olympics.
John Biglow (Lakeside), finished 4th at the 1984 Summer Olympics in the men's single sculls.
Sherry Cassuto (Lakeside), competed in the women's quadruple sculls event at the 1988 Summer Olympics.
Paul Enquist (Ballard), Olympic gold medalist in the double scull at the 1984 Summer Olympics.
Ted Garhart (Garfield), a legendary stroke on the University of Washington crew team. Only husky to never lose a race.
Lou Gellermann (Roosevelt), alternate for the coxed four at the 1960 Summer Olympics. Later in life served as the popular public address announcer at Husky Stadium, known for his opening line, "Hello Dawg Fans!".
Jan Harville (Roosevelt), qualified for the 1980 Summer Olympics and competed in the women's coxed four event at the 1984 Summer Olympics.
Phil Henry (Lakeside), gold medal winner at the 1997 and 1999 World Rowing Championships and an alternate at the 2000 Summer Olympics.
Tamara Jenkins (Roosevelt), sprint canoer who competed in the 2000 Summer Olympics.
Betsy McCagg (Lakeside), competed in three straight Olympics in the women's eight. Named USRowing's female athlete of the year in 1995.
Mary McCagg (Lakeside), finished 4th in the women's eight at the 1996 Summer Olympics.
Jordan Malloch (Nathan Hale), two-time U.S. Olympic sprint canoer.
Katie Maloney (Rainier Beach), competed in the women's eight event at the 2000 Summer Olympics.
Lindsay Meyer (Holy Names), competed at the 2008 Summer Olympics in the quadruple sculls.
Allen Morgan (Queen Anne), coxed the American boat that won the gold medal in the coxed four event in the 1948 Summer Olympics.
Lianne Nelson (Lakeside), competed in both the 2000 and 2004 Summer Olympics in the women's eight. Earned a silver medal in 2004.
Shyril O'Steen (Garfield), member of gold medal-winning women's eight at the 1984 Summer Olympics.
Lia Pernell, (Garfield), competed at the 2008 Summer Olympics in the quadruple sculls.
Joe Rantz (Roosevelt), Olympic gold medalist at the 1936 Summer Olympics.
Roy Rubin (Roosevelt), competed in the men's coxed four event at the 1960 Summer Olympics.
Al Ulbrickson Jr. (Roosevelt ), Olympic bronze medalist at the 1952 Summer Olympics.
Al Ulbrickson Sr. (Franklin), head coach of the University of Washington men's crew team for 31 years. Won six national titles.
Raymond Wright (Lakeside), competed in the men's coxless four event at the 1968 Summer Olympics.
Mike Yonker (Roosevelt), competed in the men's coxed four event at the 1960 Summer Olympics.

Soccer

Seyi Adekoya (Lakeside), former professional soccer player who played for Seattle Sounders FC and in Europe.
Handwalla Bwana (Ballard), former MLS player for Seattle Sounders FC and Nashville SC.
Ethan Dobbelaere (Roosevelt), current MLS player for Seattle Sounders FC.
Aaron Kovar (Garfield), former MLS player for Seattle Sounders FC and Los Angeles FC.
Ellis McLoughlin (Blanchet), former professional soccer player.
Brian Schmetzer (Nathan Hale), former professional soccer player and current head coach of Seattle Sounders FC.
Wynne McIntosh (Roosevelt), played professionally in the Frauen Bundesliga.
DeAndre Yedlin (O'Dea), US International who currently plays in the Premier League.

Swimming

Lynn Colella (Nathan Hale), U.S. Olympic swimmer and silver medalist at the 1972 Summer Olympics.
Rick Colella (Nathan Hale), two-time U.S. Olympic swimmer and bronze medalist at the 1976 Summer Olympics.
Ray Daughters (Queen Anne), coached the US Olympic Swim Team in four consecutive Olympic Games. Member of the ASCA Hall of Fame.
B. J. Johnson (Garfield), international swimmer who competed at the 2013 World Championship.
Helene Madison (Lincoln), three-time 1932 Summer Olympics gold-medal winner. Set 26 world records.
Jack Medica (Lincoln), won a gold and silver medal at the 1936 Summer Olympics. Set 11 world records.
Jillian Penner (Roosevelt), competed in the 2008 Summer Olympics in synchronized swimming.
Emily Silver (Bainbridge), Olympic silver medalist at the 2008 Summer Olympics.

Tennis
Patricia Bostrom (Chief Sealth), former professional tennis player.
Tom Gorman (Seattle Prep), former professional tennis player.
Dick Knight (Shoreline), former tennis player who played at Wimbledon and the U.S. Open.
Henry Prusoff (Garfield), professional tennis player in the 1930s and 1940s.

Track and Field

Steve Anderson (Queen Anne), silver medalist at the 1928 Summer Olympics in the 110-meter hurdles. Tied the world record in the 120-yard hurdles.
Duncan Atwood (Lakeside), javelin thrower who qualified for the 1980 and 1984 Summer Olympics.
Michael Berry (Rainier Beach), sprinter who was part of the goal medal winning 4x400-meter relay team at the 2011 World Championship.
Ginnie Crawford (Rainier Beach), two-time US national champion in the 100-meter hurdles. Won a bronze medal at the 2006 IAAF World Cup.
Edwin Genung (Roosevelt), placed 4th in the 800 meters at the 1932 Summer Olympics.
Charles Greene (O'Dea), former world record holder in the 100-meter dash. Won a gold and bronze medal at the 1968 Summer Olympics.
Don Kardong (Seattle Prep), fourth-place finisher in the marathon at the 1976 Summer Olympics. Founder of the Bloomsday Run.
Herm Nelson (Seattle Prep), two time Olympian who competed in the 50 kilometres walk.
Rick Noji (Franklin), a high jumper who competed at three World Championships. Also a six time All-American at University of Washington.
Gus Pope (Queen Anne), won the bronze medal in the discus throw at the 1920 Summer Olympics and finished fourth in 1924
Bill Roe (Nathan Hale), former president of USA Track & Field.
Cheryl Taplin (Cleveland), sprinter who completed for the United States at the 1997 and 1999 World Championships.

Other

Debbie Armstrong (Garfield), alpine skier who won the gold medal in giant slalom in the 1984 Winter Olympics.
Fred Beckey (West Seattle), mountaineer who made more first ascents than any other North American climber.
Royal Brougham (Franklin), sports editor at the Seattle Post-Intelligencer who worked at the newspaper for 68 years.
Dewey Soriano (Franklin), former Pacific Coast League president and part owner of Seattle Pilots.
Ray Eckmann (Lincoln), served as the athletic director for the University of Washington in the 1930s and 1940s.
William Farrell (O'Dea), world class wrestler who went on to coach the US national team for many years.
Ila Ray Hadley (Roosevelt), competed at the 1960 Winter Olympics in figure skating.
Phil Heath (Rainier Beach), professional bodybuilder and seven time Mr. Olympia winner.
Rick Kaminski (Lincoln), beloved Seattle sports stadium food hawker known as "The Peanut Man".
Cynthia Kauffman (Franklin), figure skater who was four time national champion and three time World bronze medalist and two time Olympian.
Ronald Kauffman (Franklin), figure skater who was four time national champion and three time World bronze medalist and two time Olympian.
Leo Lassen (Lincoln), local baseball broadcaster.
Darwin Meisnest (Lincoln), University of Washington athletic director from 1919 to 1927. Played a key role in the construction of Husky Stadium.
Kiel Reijnen (Bainbridge), professional cyclist.
Pete Schoening (Roosevelt), mountaineer.
Bill Scott (Shoreline), beloved Seattle sports stadium beer vendor known as "Bill the Beerman".
Rachel Scott (Bainbridge), alternate on the US Olympic Water Polo team in the 2000 Summer Olympics.
Dewey Soriano (Franklin), was the part-owner of the Seattle Pilots and president of both the Pacific Coast League and the Western International League.
Jim Whittaker (West Seattle), mountaineer and first American to climb Mount Everest.
Lou Whittaker (West Seattle), mountaineer.

References

External links

 Seaking District II official website
Washington Interscholastic Activities Association official website

High school sports conferences and leagues in the United States
 
Sports in King County, Washington